Pere Tutusaus Vila  is a Grand Prix motorcycle racer from Spain.

Career statistics

By season

Races by year

References

External links
 Profile on motogp.com

1990 births
Living people
Spanish motorcycle racers
Motorcycle racers from Catalonia
125cc World Championship riders
FIM Superstock 1000 Cup riders